Woodbridge Hall may refer to:

 Woodbridge Hall, Hewitt Quadrangle, Yale University, New Haven, Connecticut
 Woodbridge Hall, Reed College, Portland, Oregon